Lucilia caesar is a member of the fly family Calliphoridae commonly known as blow flies. L. caesar is commonly referred to as the common greenbottle, although this name may also refer to L. sericata. The adult flies typically feed on pollen and nectar of flowers. The larvae feed mainly on carrion.

Lucilia caesar is predominantly from Europe, Asia and North Africa. To induce diapause for the L. Caesar the flies need number of factors such as environmental, desiccation, areiation, being in a range with low temperatures and having a reliable food source for the growing larvae. In 2019 maggots of this species were discovered as myiasis in a wild boar in Italy.

References

 Supperer R., Hinaidy H.K. 1986. Ein Beitrag zum Parasitenbefall der Hunde und Katzen in Osterreich. Deutsch Tierarztl Wochenschr 93:383 386.
 Ring, R.A. 1967a. Photoperidic control of diapause induction in the larva of Lucilia caesar L (Diptera:Calliphoridae). J. Exp. Biol. 46: 117–122.

Calliphoridae
Muscomorph flies of Europe
Flies described in 1758
Taxa named by Carl Linnaeus